Tegelberg is a mountain of Bavaria, Germany.

It is a part of the Ammergau Alps. The nearest town is Füssen. Neuschwanstein Castle and Hohenschwangau Castle are about 2 km away.

The Tegelberg has been a hang gliding area since the 1970s and a paragliding area since this adventure sport became popular in Germany. The FAI Hanggliding World Championship 1983 took place there.

External links

References  

Mountains of Bavaria
Ammergau Alps
Mountains of the Alps